Potexvirus is a genus of pathogenic viruses in the order Tymovirales, in the family Alphaflexiviridae. Plants serve as natural hosts. There are 48 species in this genus, three of which are assigned to a subgenus. Diseases associated with this genus include: mosaic and ringspot symptoms. The genus name comes from POTato virus X).

Taxonomy
Potexvirus contains one subgenus that has three species and 45 additional species unassigned to a subgenus. The following 48 species are assigned to the genus:

 Subgenus: Mandarivirus
 Citrus yellow mottle-associated virus
 Citrus yellow vein clearing virus
 Indian citrus ringspot virus

The following species are unassigned to a subgenus:

Allium virus X
Alstroemeria virus X
Alternanthera mosaic virus
Ambrosia asymptomatic virus 1
Asparagus virus 3
Babaco mosaic virus
Bamboo mosaic virus
Cactus virus X
Cassava Colombian symptomless virus
Cassava common mosaic virus
Cassava virus X
Clover yellow mosaic virus
Cnidium virus X
Cymbidium mosaic virus
Euonymus yellow mottle associated virus
Euonymus yellow vein virus
Foxtail mosaic virus
Hosta virus X
Hydrangea ringspot virus
Lagenaria mild mosaic virus
Lettuce virus X
Lily virus X
Malva mosaic virus
Mint virus X
Narcissus mosaic virus
Nerine virus X
Opuntia virus X
Papaya mosaic virus
Pepino mosaic virus
Phaius virus X
Pitaya virus X
Plantago asiatica mosaic virus
Plantain virus X
Potato aucuba mosaic virus
Potato virus X
Schlumbergera virus X
Senna mosaic virus
Strawberry mild yellow edge virus
Tamus red mosaic virus
Tulip virus X
Turtle grass virus X
Vanilla virus X
White clover mosaic virus
Yam virus X
Zygocactus virus X

Virology
The virion length may vary considerably (between 470-1000 nanometers or more) and is 12-13 nm in diameter. The pitch of the helix is of the basic helix 3.3-3.7 nm (8-9 copies of the coat protein per turn). It is non-enveloped, flexuous and filamentous. The coat itself is composed of 1000-1500 copies of the coat protein.

The genome is linear, 5.9-7 kilobases in length with a capped 5' end and a polyadenylated 3' end. The genome encodes 5 proteins. From left to right these proteins are: the viral replication protein that consists of a capping enzyme domain, a helicase-like domain, the RNA dependent RNA polymerase, three proteins - the triple gene block (TGB) 1, 2 and 3 - and the coat protein.

The RNA is translated giving rise to the viral RNA polymerase. This in turn produces a negative stranded template from which a series of subgenomic RNAs are generated. These subgenomic RNAs are then translated into the viral proteins.

The 5' end is about 80 nucleotides in length and typically begins with the sequence GAAAA.

In addition to its RNA polymerase activity, the viral RNA polymerase (molecular weight ~150 kiloDaltons) also has methyltransferase and RNA helicase activities.

The TGB proteins are conserved among the Allexivirus, Carlavirus, Foveavirus, Furovirus, Hordeivirus, Pecluvirus, Pomovirus and Potexvirus genera. Their functions are a matter of active research.

TGB 1 (molecular weight 23 kDa) is a multifunctional protein. It has RNA helicase activity and seems to be involved in cell to cell movement.

The TGB 2 (molecular weight 11 kDa) and TGB 3 (molecular weight 10 kDa) proteins associate with the endoplasmic reticulum.

The coat protein has a molecular weight of ~25kDa.

The 3' untranslated region is ~100 nucleotides in length.

Life cycle
Viral replication is cytoplasmic. Entry into the host cell is achieved by penetration into the host cell. Replication follows the positive stranded RNA virus replication model. Positive stranded RNA virus transcription is the method of transcription. Translation takes place by leaky scanning. The virus exits the host cell by tripartite non-tubule guided viral movement. The virus is transmitted via a vector (insects). Transmission routes are vector and mechanical.

Hosts
Known hosts are various flowering plants.

Distribution
These viruses appear to occur worldwide.

References

External links

 
 Viralzone: Potexvirus

Potexviruses
Viral plant pathogens and diseases
Virus genera